The 2011–12 Serie B (known as the Serie bwin for sponsorship reasons) was the eightieth season since its establishment in 1929. A total of 22 teams will contest the league: 15 of which returning from the 2010–11 season, four of which promoted from Lega Pro Prima Divisione, and three relegated from Serie A. It began on 27 August 2011 and ended on 27 May 2012.

Changes from last season
The league will feature three clubs relegated from Serie A: Brescia returned to the second division after only a single season in the top flight, whereas Bari were relegated after a two-year stint. The third relegated team, Sampdoria, made instead a rather unexpected Serie B return after nine years.

Four teams were promoted from Lega Pro Prima Divisione, three of them returning to Serie B after significant absences, and two of them will play Serie B for their second time in history, Gubbio after 63 years and Juve Stabia after 59 years, while Nocerina will take part to its third Serie B after 32 years. The fourth promoted team, Verona, make instead their return to Serie B after four years; Verona will also participate as one of only three teams in the league who won the Italian national championship at some point in history (the other two being Sampdoria and Torino).

Events
The league started with a number of teams being punished with Ascoli being docked six points (then reduced to three) as a consequence of the 2011 Italian football scandal. Ascoli were also docked one point due to failing to pay social security money in time, together with Crotone and Juve Stabia.

Later in October 2011, Juve Stabia were docked five more points (successively reduced to three) due to their involvement in a matchfixing scandal regarding a 2008–09 Lega Pro Prima Divisione game against Sorrento. Still in October, Ascoli were docked three more points (now totalling a seven-point overall deduction) due to failing to meet some financial deadlines.

On 3 December 2011, the Padova–Torino league match was suspended with the home club leading 1–0 due to an electric stadium blackout; the game was completed 11 days later, and ended with the same result as earlier. Torino, however, appealed against Padova, claiming the home club was responsible for the blackout issue, and asked for being awarded the three points instead. In March 2012, the sports magistrature ultimately ruled in favour of the recurring club, and changed the result to a 3–0 win for Torino. Padova, however, successfully appealed at the Court of Federal Justice against the ruling, and on 27 April 2012 the result was switched back to a 1–0 win for the home club.

On 14 April 2012, the Pescara–Livorno game was halted after 30 minutes (the result being 0–2 at the time of suspension) after Livorno footballer Piermario Morosini suffered a heart failure on the pitch and eventually died in transport to hospital. The event caused the immediate cancellation of all Italian football games for the week, with the involving matches (including the remaining 60 minutes of Pescara–Livorno) being delayed to mid-May. 

The first season verdict, AlbinoLeffe's relegation after nine consecutive years in the division, came on 5 May 2012. Seven days later, Gubbio became the second relegated club of the season, thus going down on their first season back. On 20 May 2012, the first promotion verdicts arrived as Torino, having already been champion of winter, and Pescara mathematically ensured themselves a place in the top flight for the following season; on that same day, it was also made official that Sassuolo, Verona, Varese and Sampdoria will be the four participants to the post-season promotion playoff tournament. The final regular season week marked Nocerina's direct relegation after only one season following a defeat at the hands of newly crowned champions Pescara, whereas Vicenza and Empoli will play a two-legged relegation playoff to determine the fourth team destined to go down to Lega Pro Prima Divisione.

Teams

Stadia and locations

Personnel and kits

Managerial changes

League table

Results

Play-off

Promotion
Semi-finals
In case of an aggregate tie, the higher seed advances.
First legs will be played on 30 May 2012; return legs on 2 June 2012

Finals
In case of an aggregate tie, the higher seed advances.
First leg played 6 June 2012; return leg played 9 June 2012

Sampdoria promoted to Serie A.

Relegation
First leg played on 3 June 2012; return leg played on 8 June 2012
In case of an aggregate tie, the higher seed advances.

Vicenza is relegated to Lega Pro Prima Divisione.

Top goalscorers
Updated 21 May 2012

28 goals
  Ciro Immobile (Pescara)
21 goals
  Marco Sau (Juve Stabia)
20 goals
  Ferdinando Sforzini (Grosseto)
  Gianluca Sansone (Sassuolo)
19 goals
  Francesco Tavano (Empoli)
18 goals
  Lorenzo Insigne (Pescara)
17 goals
  Caetano (Crotone)
16 goals
  Jonathas (Brescia)
  Marco Sansovini (Pescara)
15 goals
  Nicola Pozzi (Sampdoria)
  Papa Waigo (Ascoli)
14 goals
  Juanito (Verona)

References

Serie B seasons
2
Italy